Digital Pinball: Last Gladiators  is a video game developed and published by KAZe for the Sega Saturn. Its working title was Pinball Arena. A successor, Digital Pinball: Necronomicon, was released in 1996 for the Saturn. An updated version, Digital Pinball: Last Gladiators Ver.9.7, was released in 1997 for the Saturn. Last Gladiators was ported to iOS in April 2010 as Last Gladiators Ver.2010.

Gameplay
Digital Pinball: Last Gladiators has four pinball tables, each with its own themes; Gladiators, Knight of the Roses, Dragon Showdown and Warlock. Points are earned by hitting various targets, lanes, ramps and bumpers in the playfield. Before launching a ball, players have the option to choose between three bonus options of varying nature, e.g. starting the currently lit bonus round, super kickback, activating the extraball and/or a random bonus target, 2x playfield, super jets, activating the deathwatch (out hole) bonus and various point bonuses. In addition to multiball rounds, each table has nine special bonus rounds culminating into an "Ultimate Round" when all bonus rounds have been completed (”Gladiator Show" for Gladiators, "Necromancer" for Knight of the Roses, "Banzai Showdown" for Dragon Showdown and "Last Judgment" for Warlock). The game ends when the player loses three balls in succession and/or any extraballs earned. The player's high scores for each table are then displayed in the "Last Gladiators Hall of Fame".

Reception

Next Generation reviewed the Saturn version of the game, rating it four stars out of five, and praised Last Gladiators'  "excellent programming" and 'convincing faithfulness' to a real pinball machine, further praising the game's bonuses and skill shots. Next Generation expressed that Last Gladiators is 'more accurate' than other virtual pinball games, and summarized the game as "a great deal of fun".

GamePro reviewed the Saturn version of Last Gladiators, criticizing it as "unimaginative" but 'fine', praising its sound effects and "slick" animations, and concluded by recommending the game to "hard-core" pinball fans. Mean Machines Sega gave the Saturn version of Digital Pinball an overall score of 67%, calling the game "beautifully presented", praising its "crisp" graphics and "stylish" UI, as well as its "crystal clear" sound effects. Mean Machines further calls Digital Pinball "a remarkably close interpretation of real pinball", but criticized its table design; while praising the themed visuals of each table, Mean Machines calls them "cramped" and "uninspiring", summarizing the only goal of the game as 'gaining points', and criticized the lack of bonus effects as the player gains points.

Reviews
Ação Games
Hyper
Video Games

Notes

References

External links

Digital Pinball: Last Gladiators at Giant Bomb

1995 video games
IOS games
Pinball video games
Sega Saturn games
Sega video games
Time Warner Interactive games
Video games developed in Japan